The A-League Men is an Australian professional league for association football clubs. At the top of the Australian soccer league system, it is the country's primary soccer competition and is contested by 12 clubs. The competition was formed in April 2004, following  a number of issues including financial problems in the National Soccer League. Those records and statistics of the A-League Men are listed below. All updated as of 6 March 2023.

Team records

Titles
Most Premiership titles: 4, Sydney FC
Most Championship titles: 5, Sydney FC
Most consecutive Premiership title wins: 2, Sydney FC (2016–17, 2017–18); Melbourne City (2020–21, 2021–22)
Most consecutive Championship title wins: 2, Brisbane Roar (2011, 2012), Sydney FC (2019, 2020)
Biggest Premiership title winning margin: 17 points, 2016–17; Sydney FC (66 points) over Melbourne Victory (49 points)
Smallest Premiership title winning margin: 0 points and same goal difference, 2008–09; Melbourne Victory over Adelaide United through more goals scored.

Points
Most points in a season: 66, Sydney FC (2016–17)
Most home points in a season: 33, Brisbane Roar (2010–11, 2013–14)
Most away points in a season: 34, Sydney FC (2014–15)
Fewest points in a season: 6, New Zealand Knights (2005–06)
Fewest home points in a season: 2, New Zealand Knights (2005–06)
Fewest away points in a season: 4, New Zealand Knights (2005–06)
Most points in a season without winning the league: 57, Central Coast Mariners (2010–11)
Fewest points in a season while winning the league: 34, Central Coast Mariners (2007–08)

Wins
Most wins in total: 202, Sydney FC
Most wins in a season: 20, Sydney FC (2016–17, 2017–18)
Most home wins in a season: 10
Brisbane Roar (2010–11, 2013–14)
Sydney FC (2016–17)
Most away wins in a season: 10
Western Sydney Wanderers (2012–13)
Sydney FC (2016–17)
Fewest wins in a season: 1, New Zealand Knights (2005–06)
Fewest home wins in a season: 0, New Zealand Knights (2005–06)
Fewest away wins in a season: 1, New Zealand Knights (2005–06)
Most consecutive wins: 10, Western Sydney Wanderers (13 January 2013 – 16 March 2013)
Most consecutive home wins: 8, Melbourne Victory (21 November 2008 – 28 February 2009)
Most consecutive away wins: 8, Melbourne Victory (9 September 2006 – 30 December 2006)
Most consecutive games without a win: 19
New Zealand Knights (18 September 2005 – 27 August 2006)
Melbourne City (24 February 2013 – 17 January 2014)
Most consecutive home games without a win: 11, New Zealand Knights (2 September 2005 – 27 August 2006)
Most consecutive away games without a win: 22, Melbourne City (2 February 2012 – 16 February 2014)

Defeats
Most defeats in total: 183, Central Coast Mariners
Most defeats in a season: 20, Central Coast Mariners (2015–16)
Most home defeats in a season: 9, North Queensland Fury (2010–11)
Most away defeats in a season: 12, Melbourne City (2012–13) 
Fewest defeats in a season: 1
Brisbane Roar (2010–11)
Sydney FC (2016–17)
Fewest home defeats in a season: 0
Brisbane Roar (2010–11)
Sydney FC (2016–17)
Fewest away defeats in a season: 0, Sydney FC (2014–15)
Most consecutive games undefeated: 36, Brisbane Roar (18 September 2010 – 26 November 2011)
Most consecutive home games undefeated: 29, Sydney FC (2 April 2016 – 17 March 2018)
Most consecutive away games undefeated: 16, Brisbane Roar (3 October 2010 – 19 November 2011)
Most consecutive defeats: 11, New Zealand Knights (18 September 2005 – 26 November 2005)
Most consecutive home defeats: 7, New Zealand Knights (2 September 2005 – 26 November 2005)
Most consecutive away defeats: 9
New Zealand Knights (8 January 2006 – 26 November 2006)
Melbourne City (14 December 2012 – 30 March 2013)

Draws
Most draws in total: 107, Brisbane Roar
Most draws in a season: 12, Western Sydney Wanderers (2016–17)
Most home draws in a season: 7
Central Coast Mariners (2009–10)
Melbourne Victory (2011–12)
Western Sydney Wanderers (2016–17)
Most away draws in a season: 6
Central Coast Mariners (2005–06, 2010–11)
Brisbane Roar (2010–11)
Adelaide United (2011–12)
Sydney FC (2011–12)
Fewest draws in a season: 2, Melbourne Victory (2008–09)
Most consecutive draws: 6, Wellington Phoenix (4 September 2009 – 17 October 2009)
Most consecutive home draws: 5, Perth Glory (28 December 2006 – 9 September 2007)
Most consecutive away draws: 5, Western Sydney Wanderers (15 April 2017 – 12 November 2017)

Goals
Most goals scored in a season: 64, Sydney FC (2017–18)
Fewest goals scored in a season: 13, New Zealand Knights (2006–07)
Most goals conceded in a season: 70, Central Coast Mariners (2015–16)
Fewest goals conceded in a season: 12, Sydney FC (2016–17)
Best goal difference in a season: +43, Sydney FC (2016–17)
Worst goal difference in a season: –37, Central Coast Mariners (2015–16)
Most goals scored at home in a season: 35, Melbourne City (2015–16)
Most goals scored away in a season: 30, Sydney FC (2016–17)
Fewest goals scored at home in a season: 8, New Zealand Knights (2006–07)
Fewest goals scored away in a season: 4, New Zealand Knights (2005–06)
Most goals conceded at home in a season: 32, Central Coast Mariners (2015–16)
Most goals conceded away in a season: 38, Central Coast Mariners (2015–16)
Fewest goals conceded at home in a season: 4, Sydney FC (2016–17)
Fewest goals conceded away in a season: 8, Western Sydney Wanderers (2012–13), Sydney FC (2016–17)
Most clean sheets in a season: 16, Sydney FC (2016–17)
Fewest clean sheets in a season: 0, Central Coast Mariners (2015–16)
Most clean sheets in total: 142, Sydney FC
Fewest failures to score in a match in a season: 3, Brisbane Roar (2010–11)
Most goals scored in total: 761, Melbourne Victory
Most goals conceded in total: 721, Central Coast Mariners
Most home goals scored in total: 434, Melbourne Victory
Most home goals conceded in total: 341, Central Coast Mariners
Most away goals scored in total: 358, Sydney FC
Most away goals conceded in total: 402, Perth Glory

Disciplinary
Most yellow cards in total: 1,004, Adelaide United
Most red cards in total: 60, Melbourne Victory
Most yellow cards in a season: 79, Sydney FC (2012–13 & 2015–16)
Fewest yellow cards in one season: 23, Perth Glory (2005–06)
Most red cards in total: 10, Perth Glory (2010–11)
Most yellow cards in one match: 11
Adelaide United v Melbourne Heart, 4 April 2014
Melbourne Heart v Western Sydney Wanderers, 12 April 2014
Melbourne Victory v Melbourne City, 4 February 2017
Sydney FC v Melbourne Victory, 7 May 2017
Most red cards in one match: 3
Central Coast Mariners v Melbourne Victory, 4 November 2007
Perth Glory v Sydney FC, 7 February 2015
Adelaide United v Brisbane Roar, 2 February 2019
Most fair play awards: 6, Brisbane Roar

Scorelines
Biggest home win: 8–1 (Adelaide United v North Queensland Fury, 21 January 2011), 7–0 (Adelaide United v Newcastle Jets, 24 January 2015), 7-0 (Melbourne City v Melbourne Victory, 17 April 2021)
Biggest away win: 2–8 (Central Coast Mariners v Newcastle Jets, 14 April 2018)
Highest scoring: 2–8 (Central Coast Mariners v Newcastle Jets, 14 April 2018)

Attendances

Highest attendance, single match: 61,880, Sydney FC v Western Sydney Wanderers, Stadium Australia, 8 October 2016)
Lowest attendance, single match: 38, Wellington Phoenix v Brisbane Roar, Leichhardt Oval, 16 February 2022)
Highest season average attendance: 31,374 – Melbourne Victory (2006–07)
Lowest season average attendance: 3,022 – New Zealand Knights (2006–07)

These figures do not take into account the 2019–20 and 2020–21 seasons, when many matches had an attendance of zero due to the COVID-19 pandemic.

Player records

Appearances

 Most A-League Men appearances: 376
 Leigh Broxham (7 January 2007 to 26 February 2023)
 Nikolai Topor-Stanley (22 July 2006 to 5 February 2023)
 Most different clubs played for: 7
 Antony Golec (for Sydney FC, Adelaide United, Western Sydney Wanderers, Perth Glory, Central Coast Mariners, Wellington Phoenix and Macarthur FC)
 Liam Reddy (for Newcastle Jets, Brisbane Roar, Wellington Phoenix, Sydney FC, Central Coast Mariners, Western Sydney Wanderers and Perth Glory)
 Youngest player: Alusine Fofanah, 15 years, 189 days (for Western Sydney Wanderers v Adelaide United, 19 January 2014)
 Oldest player: Romário, 40 years 320 days (for Adelaide United v Newcastle Jets, 15 December 2006)
 Most consecutive A-League Men appearances: 98, Alex Wilkinson (4 November 2007 until 13 March 2011)

Players currently playing in the A-League Men are highlighted in bold.

Goals

First A-League Men goal: Carl Veart (for Adelaide United v. Newcastle Jets, 26 August 2005)
Most A-League Men goals: 142, Besart Berisha
Most goals in Finals series: 10
 Besart Berisha
 Archie Thompson
Most goals in a match: 5
 Archie Thompson (for Melbourne Victory v Adelaide United, 18 February 2007)
 Jamie Maclaren (for Melbourne City v Melbourne Victory, 17 April 2021)
Most goals in a season: 27, Bobô (for Sydney FC, 2017–18)
Most appearances without scoring a goal: 150, Adam D'Apuzzo
Most consecutive matches scored in: 8, Andy Keogh (for  Perth Glory, 13 February 2016 – 3 April 2016) 
Most hat-tricks: 5, Besart Berisha and Jamie Maclaren
Fastest hat-trick: 6 minutes, Besart Berisha (for Brisbane Roar v Adelaide United, 28 October 2011)
Most own goals: 7, Nigel Boogaard
Most penalties scored: 26, Jamie Maclaren

Players currently playing in the A-League Men are highlighted in bold.

Goalkeepers
Players currently playing in the A-League Men are highlighted in bold.

Most A-League Men clean sheets (career): 90, Liam Reddy
Longest time without conceding a goal: 876 minutes, Michael Theo
Most clean sheets in one season: 15, Danny Vukovic (2016–17)
Most Goalkeeper of the Year Awards: 4, Eugene Galekovic
Most goals scored by a goalkeeper: 1, Danny Vukovic

Disciplinary
Most yellow cards in a season: 11
 Steve Pantelidis (for Gold Coast United, 2009–10)
 Wayne Srhoj (for Melbourne Heart, 2010–11)
 Dimas (for Western Sydney Wanderers, 2015–16)
 Joshua Brillante (for Sydney FC, 2016–17)
 Alex Rufer (for Wellington Phoenix, 2018–19)
Most red cards in a season: 3
 Besart Berisha (for Brisbane Roar, 2013–14)
 Nigel Boogaard (for Newcastle Jets, 2015–16)
 Harrison Delbridge (for Melbourne City, 2019–20)
Most yellow cards in total: 85, Andrew Durante
Most red cards in total: 10, Nigel Boogaard
Earliest red card: 57 seconds, Ante Covic for Melbourne Victory against Brisbane Roar, 5 November 2011
Quickest red card (substitute): 9 seconds from restart of play to red card offence, Ruben Zadkovich for Perth Glory. Play restarted at 60:33 after his substitution took place following a Perth goal, his red card offence was a foul on Vince Lia at 60:42. 
Most red cards for a single team in one season: 10, Perth Glory (2010–11)
Longest suspension: 9 months, with 3 months suspended, Danny Vukovic (2008). Originally 15 months, with 3 months suspended, the sentence was reduced and restructured after two appeals.
 Most appearances without a booking: 44
 Romeo Castelen
 Chris Naumoff
 Most appearances without a red card: 355, Alex Wilkinson

Other individual records
Most A-League Men Premiership wins: 4, Michael Theo
Most A-League Men Championship wins: 5, Michael Theo
Most Golden Boot Awards: 2, Shane Smeltz, Besart Berisha
Most Joe Marston Medal Awards: 1, 13 players
Most Johnny Warren Medal Awards: 2, Thomas Broich
Most Young Footballer of the Year Awards: 2, Mathew Ryan, Jamie Maclaren
Most Goal of the Year Awards: 2, Carlos Hernández

Manager records

Most A-League Premiership wins: 3, Graham Arnold (Central Coast Mariners) – 2011–12, (Sydney FC) – 2016–17, 2017–18
Most A-League Championship wins: 2
 Ernie Merrick (Melbourne Victory) – 2007, 2009
 Ange Postecoglou (Brisbane Roar) – 2010, 2012
 Graham Arnold (Central Coast Mariners) – 2013, (Sydney FC) – 2017
 Kevin Muscat (Melbourne Victory) – 2015, 2018
Most bookings for a manager: 10, Ufuk Talay
Most Coach of the Year Awards: 3, Graham Arnold
Most games managed: 308, Ernie Merrick
Longest spell as manager: 151 games, Ernie Merrick (Melbourne Victory)
Shortest-serving manager (excluding caretakers): 7 games, Nick Theodorakopoulos (Newcastle Jets)
Youngest manager: Des Buckingham, 31 years, 307 days (for Wellington Phoenix v Central Coast Mariners, 10 December 2016)

All-time A-League table
The all-time A-League table is a cumulative record of all match results, points and goals of every team that has played in the A-League since its inception in 2005. The table that follows is accurate as of the end of the 2021-22 season. Teams in bold are part of the current A-League season. This table does not include the finals series.

See also
 List of A-League honours
 List of A-League hat-tricks
 Australian clubs in the AFC Champions League

References

 
Australia